Al-Ghadeer Sport Club, is an Iraqi football team based in Karbala, that plays in the Iraq Division Three.

Managerial history
 Amir Abdul-Hussein

See also
 2021–22 Iraq Division Three

References

External links
 Iraq Clubs- Foundation Dates

2003 establishments in Iraq
Association football clubs established in 2003
Football clubs in Karbala